Muse are an English alternative rock band from Teignmouth, Devon. Originally formed in 1994, the band features vocalist, guitarist and keyboardist Matt Bellamy, bassist and backing vocalist Chris Wolstenholme, and drummer Dominic Howard. The band released their debut full-length studio album Showbiz in 1999, songwriting for which was credited entirely to Bellamy. Origin of Symmetry followed in 2001, which once again credited Bellamy for songwriting, but also featured the band's first cover version recording in the form of "Feeling Good".

In 2002 the band released their first live video album Hullabaloo: Live at Le Zenith, Paris, which was accompanied by Hullabaloo Soundtrack featuring a number of B-sides from previously released singles and live tracks from the video album. The Hullabaloo albums also spawned one single, "Dead Star/In Your World", which featured a cover of Frankie Valli's "Can't Take My Eyes Off You" as one of its B-sides. Absolution was released in 2003, which is the band's only album released to date to credit all three members for composition of the music.

Muse returned in 2006 with their fourth album Black Holes and Revelations, which reverted to crediting solely Bellamy for songwriting. In 2009 this was followed by The Resistance, on which the song "United States of Eurasia" featured elements from Frédéric Chopin's Nocturne in E-flat major, Op. 9, No. 2, and "I Belong to You" featured elements from Camille Saint-Saëns' "Mon cœur s'ouvre à ta voix". "Neutron Star Collision (Love Is Forever)", a single from the romantic fantasy film The Twilight Saga: Eclipse, was released the following year.

The 2nd Law was released in 2012, which featured the first songs written and sung by Wolstenholme: "Save Me" and "Liquid State". The band's seventh studio album, Drones, was released in 2015, once again crediting Bellamy alone.

Simulation Theory is the eighth studio album by English rock band Muse. It was released on 9 November 2018 through Warner Bros. Records and Helium-3. Muse co-produced the album with Rich Costey, Mike Elizondo, Shellback, and Timbaland. Following the darker themes of Muse's prior albums, Simulation Theory incorporates lighter influences from science fiction and 1980s pop culture, with extensive use of synthesisers. The contemporary political climate of the United States informed the lyrics.

Songs

Footnotes

References

External links
List of Muse songs at AllMusic

Muse

Muse song